Luis Alberto Villarreal García (born November 11, 1974 in San Miguel de Allende, Guanajuato) is a Mexican politician affiliated with the National Action Party (PAN). He is a former municipal president of Allende and is currently in the upper house of the Mexican Congress representing Guanajuato.

References

External links
Luis Alberto Villarreal website

Living people
1974 births
Politicians from Guanajuato
20th-century Mexican lawyers
National Action Party (Mexico) politicians
Members of the Chamber of Deputies (Mexico)
Municipal presidents in Guanajuato
Members of the Senate of the Republic (Mexico)
People from San Miguel de Allende
20th-century Mexican politicians
21st-century Mexican politicians